Coagulation factor XIII B chain is a protein that in humans is encoded by the F13B gene.

This gene encodes coagulation factor XIII B subunit. Coagulation factor XIII is the last zymogen to become activated in the blood coagulation cascade. Plasma factor XIII is a heterotetramer composed of 2 A subunits and 2 B subunits. The A subunits have catalytic function, and the B subunits do not have enzymatic activity and may serve as a plasma carrier molecules. Platelet factor XIII is composed of just 2 A subunits, which are identical to those of plasma origin. Upon activation by the cleavage of the activation peptide by thrombin and in the presence of calcium ion, the plasma factor XIII dissociates its B subunits and yields the same active enzyme, factor XIIIa, as platelet factor XIII. This enzyme acts as a transglutaminase to catalyze the formation of gamma-glutamyl-epsilon-lysine crosslinking between fibrin molecules, thus stabilizing the fibrin clot. Factor XIII deficiency is classified into two categories: type I deficiency, characterized by the lack of both the A and B subunits; and type II deficiency, characterized by the lack of the A subunit alone.  These defects can result in a lifelong bleeding tendency, defective wound healing, and habitual abortion.

Interactions
F13B has been shown to interact with Coagulation factor XIII, A1 polypeptide.

References

Further reading